The Diam Piece is the fourth studio album by American rapper Diamond D. The album was released on September 30, 2014, by Dymond Mine Records. The album features guest appearances from Pharoahe Monch, Talib Kweli, Elzhi, Skyzoo, Fat Joe, Chi Ali, Freddie Foxxx, Pete Rock, The Pharcyde, Scram Jones, Rapsody, Boog Brown, Stacy Epps, Black Rob, Kurupt, Tha Alkaholiks, Hi-Tek, A.G., Chino XL, The Alchemist, Evidence, Grand Daddy I.U., Kev Brown, Masta Ace, Guilty Simpson and Ras Kass.

Background
In a September 2014 interview with Unkut, Diamond D spoke about the album, saying: "It’s more or less a production LP, about two and a half years it took. A lot of tracks I didn’t even use. I had about 27 tracks but I only used 18. Some of the artists I was in the studio with, and others – because of their touring schedule and my touring schedule – I just sent them music and they sent me the session back. If the track that I give them has a sample in it that’s giving it direction then they’ll follow that. If there is no sample or concept at the beginning I just let the MC’s paint their own pictures and try to figure out how can make it connect. I use a lot more live instrumentation now. I still chop and manipulate samples, but my sound just sounds bigger now. Just using better equipment so the sample frequencies are better."

Critical response 

The Diam Piece received positive reviews from music critics. Dean Mayorga of HipHopDX said, "While it is clear that Diam Piece is not without  flaws, it is a successful return nonetheless and hopefully a foreshadowing of more to come." Praverb of XXL stated, "The Diam Piece is nothing new. In fact, it is a blast from the past, when compilations reigned supreme. Listening this album brought back memories of Soundbombing or Lyricist Lounge, the presentation of thought out lyrics and accompanying backdrops works. Diamond D meticulously selected guests for this collaborative masterpiece and injects rhyming when needed. Overall, it’ll definitely keep your attention thanks to Diamond D’s crafted beat wizardry. Real hip-hop at its best."

Track listing
All tracks produced by Diamond D, except track 19 produced by DJ Scratch

Charts

References

Diamond D albums
2014 albums